Usutuaije Maamberua (born 5 August 1957) is a Namibian politician. He was the president of the South West Africa National Union (SWANU) until 2017. Maamberua has served in the National Assembly of Namibia since 2010.

Early life and education
Born in 1957 in Tsumeb, Maamberua earned three Master of Arts degrees (from the University of Namibia, Heriot-Watt University and the University of Southampton) and one Ph.D. (University of the Witwatersrand) in business and economics related fields.

Politics
An accountant by training, Maamberua worked as the Permanent Secretary of the Ministry of Finance from 1997 to 2003. In that year, Maamberua was demoted to the Ministry of Prisons and Correctional Services. Shortly after receiving the demotion, Maamberua resigned to pursue other career opportunities.  He became head of the accounting department at the University of Namibia in 2007.

Maamberua was elected to the National Assembly in the November 2009 general election. Meanwhile, as SWANU's presidential candidate, Maamberua received 2,968 votes, which placed him eighth out of twelve candidates. He was re-elected to the National Assembly in the November 2014 parliamentary election; he was the only SWANU candidate to win a seat.

References

External links
 Swanu Appeal For Socialism. Usutuaije Maamberua. The Namibian, 12 December 2008

1957 births
Living people
People from Tsumeb
Namibian accountants
Members of the National Assembly (Namibia)
University of the Witwatersrand alumni
Alumni of the University of Southampton
Academic staff of the University of Namibia
SWANU politicians
Candidates for President of Namibia